Dil Bilmaz (also Romanized as Dīl Bīlmaz; also known as Del Bīlmaz, Dīl Bīlmen, and Dīl Būlmaz) is a village in Abish Ahmad Rural District, Abish Ahmad District, Kaleybar County, East Azerbaijan Province, Iran. At the 2006 census, its population was 839, in 176 families.

The village is populated by the Kurdish Chalabianlu tribe.

References 

Populated places in Kaleybar County

Kurdish settlements in East Azerbaijan Province